Jon Moya Martín (born 5 January 1983 in Barakaldo, Biscay) is a Spanish footballer who plays for Club Portugalete as a central defender.

External links

1983 births
Living people
Spanish footballers
Footballers from Barakaldo
Association football defenders
La Liga players
Segunda División players
Segunda División B players
Tercera División players
CD Basconia footballers
Bilbao Athletic footballers
Athletic Bilbao footballers
SD Eibar footballers
Terrassa FC footballers
Barakaldo CF footballers
UE Lleida players
Deportivo Alavés players
Spain youth international footballers
Club Portugalete players